Chasing Kangaroos: A Continent, a Scientist, and a Search for the World's Most Extraordinary Creature, is a 2007 book by Professor Tim Flannery. The book draws on three decades of travel, research, and field work to explore Australia's kangaroos. Seventy species make up the kangaroo family, which includes wallabies and rat-kangaroos.

Professor Tim Flannery is also author of The Weather Makers, which received much critical acclaim.

See also
List of Australian environmental books

References

Natural history books
Environmental non-fiction books
2007 non-fiction books
Books by Tim Flannery
Australian non-fiction books
Australian travel books
Books about Australian natural history
Books about Australian history